Operation Unified Assistance was the American military's humanitarian response to the 2004 Indian Ocean earthquake and tsunami. On 28 December 2004, elements of the Combined Support Force were deployed to U-Tapao International Airport in Thailand. More than 12,600 Department of Defense personnel were involved in the relief effort.

Background 
The United States dispatched numerous C-5 and C-17 strategic airlifters and 10 C-130 Hercules tactical airlifters containing disaster supplies, 9 P-3C Orion maritime patrol aircraft for search and rescue support, and several teams from the Department of State and the Department of Defense to coordinate additional assistance from Utapao Naval Air Base in Thailand.

Carrier Strike Group 9 was dispatched to the coast of Sumatra to provide support to the Indonesian province of Aceh.

An Expeditionary Strike Group led by the amphibious assault ship , scheduled for a port call in Guam, was dispatched to render assistance. A total of 48 Navy and Marine Corps helicopters were involved. Each ship could produce around 90,000 US gallons of fresh water per day. Other ships in the group were amphibious transport dock , the guided-missile destroyer , the dock landing ship , the guided-missile frigate , the nuclear-powered submarine , guided-missile cruiser , and the coast guard cutter .

In January 2005, 24 Navy ships and one Coast Guard vessel were in the area. The last ship, departed the region in April 2005.

Indonesian public opinion of the United States markedly improved in the year after the tsunami, jumping from 15% in 2003 to 38% in 2005, going against the general trend of less favorable attitudes towards America in that time period. Many Indonesians surveyed indicated that American relief efforts generally improved their view of the United States.

See also 
 Operation Unified Response, for the 2010 Haiti earthquake
 Operation United Assistance, for the 2014 Ebola virus epidemic in West Africa

References

External links 
  
 
 
 

2004 Indian Ocean earthquake and tsunami
Humanitarian aid
Non-combat military operations involving the United States
United States Marine Corps in the 21st century